Charles John Pelham, 8th Earl of Yarborough (born 5 November 1963), styled Lord Worsley between 1966 and 1991, is a British peer and landowner. He was a member of the House of Lords from 1991 to 1999.

Background and career
Yarborough is the son of John Pelham, 7th Earl of Yarborough (1920–1991) and Florence Anne Petronel Upton (1924–2013). He was educated at Eton College and the University of Bristol.

In 1991 he succeeded his father as Earl of Yarborough (1837), Baron Worsley, of Appuldurcombe (1837) and Baron Yarborough (1794), becoming a member of the House of Lords.

He was appointed High Sheriff of Lincolnshire for 2014–15, when it was reported that he had converted to Islam and was also known by the name Abdul Mateen.

Marriage and family
Yarborough married Anna-Karin Zecevic, daughter of George Zecevic, on 26 January 1990. They have five children:

 George John Sackville Pelham, Lord Worsley (born 9 August 1990)
 William Charles John Walter Pelham (born 28 December 1991)
 James Marcus Pelham (born 8 March 1994)
 Lady Margaret Ann Emily Pelham (born 30 January 1997)
 Edward John Herbert Pelham (born 6 March 2002)

See also
 Duke of Leeds (created 1694, extinct 1964)
 The Immortal Seven
 The Glorious Revolution

References

 The Peerage.com - A genealogical survey of the peerage of Britain as well as the royal families of Europe

External links

1963 births
Living people
People educated at Eton College
8
Converts to Islam
British Muslims
High Sheriffs of Lincolnshire
Yarborough